"Little Bo-Peep" or "Little Bo-Peep has lost her sheep" is a popular English language nursery rhyme. It has a Roud Folk Song Index number of 6487.

Lyrics and melody

As with most products of oral tradition, there are many variations to the rhyme. The most common modern version is:

Little Bo-Peep has lost her sheep,
and doesn't know where to find them;
leave them alone, And they'll come home,
wagging (bringing) their tails behind them.

Common variations on second-line include "And can't tell where to find them." The fourth line is frequently given as "Bringing their tails behind them", or sometimes "Dragging their tails behind them". This alternative version is useful in the extended version, usually of four further stanzas. The melody commonly associated with the rhyme was first recorded in 1870 by the composer and nursery rhyme collector James William Elliott in his National Nursery Rhymes and Nursery Songs.

Additional verses

The following additional verses are often added to the rhyme:

Little Bo-Peep fell fast asleep,
and dreamt she heard them bleating;
but when she awoke, she found it a joke,
for they were still a-fleeting.

Then up she took her little crook,
determined for to find them;
she found them indeed, but it made her heart bleed,
for they'd left their tails behind them.

It happened one day, as Bo-Peep did stray
into a meadow hard by,
there she espied their tails side by side,
all hung on a tree to dry.

She heaved a sigh and wiped her eye,
and over the hillocks went rambling,
and tried what she could, as a shepherdess should,
to tack each again to its lambkin.

Origins and history
The earliest record of this rhyme is in a manuscript of around 1805, which contains only the first verse which references the adult Bo Peep , called 'Little' because she was short and not because she was young. There are references to a children's game called "bo-peep", from the 16th century, including one in Shakespeare's King Lear (Act I Scene iv), for which "bo-peep" is thought to refer to the children's game of peek-a-boo, but there's no evidence that the rhyme existed earlier than the 18th century. The additional verses are first recorded in the earliest printed version in a version of Gammer Gurton's Garland or The Nursery Parnassus in 1810, published in London by Joseph Johnson.

The phrase "to play bo peep" was in use from the 14th century to refer to the punishment of being stood in a pillory. For example, in 1364, an ale-wife, Alice Causton, was convicted of giving short measure, for which crime she had to "play bo peep thorowe a pillery". Andrew Boorde uses the same phrase in 1542, "". Nevertheless, connections with sheep are early; a fifteenth-century ballad includes the lines: " // In every corner they play boe-peep".

Notes

English nursery rhymes
Fictional sheep
Fictional shepherds
Songs about sheep
Songs about shepherds
Songs about fictional female characters
English folk songs
English children's songs
Traditional children's songs